Jungle Bass is an EP by American funk band Bootsy's Rubber Band. The disc was released in 1990 by 4th & Broadway Records. Jungle Bass reunites most of the original members of Bootsy's Rubber Band, whose last album was released in 1979. The album represents one of the earliest collaborations between Bootsy and producer Bill Laswell.

Track listing

"Jungle Bass" (Jungle One/Long Form) (W Collins, Bill Laswell, Bernie Worrell, Joel Johnson)  13:10
"Disciples of Funk (The Return of the Funkateers)" (W Collins, Fred Wesley, Maceo Parker, Richard Griffith, Rick Gardner)  4:41
"Jungle Bass" (House of Bass Mix) (W Collins, B Laswell, B Worrell, J Johnson) 9:03
"Interzone" (Silent Hush-Hush Mix/Cyberfunk) (W Collins, B Laswell, B Worrell, J Johnson) 3:17

Personnel

Trombone: Fred Wesley
Alto Saxophone: Maceo Parker
Trumpet: Richard Griffith, Rick Gardner
Synthesizer: Bernie Worrell, Joel "Razor Sharp" Johnson, Jeff Bova
Front Ground Vocals: Gary Cooper
Bass, Samples & Free Jazz: Bill Laswell
Space Bass, Guitar, Drums, Black Noise, Unsamples & Vocals: Bootsy Collins
Robot Vocals: Boot-Tron

References 

1990 EPs
Bootsy Collins albums
Albums produced by Bill Laswell